Andrei Zăgrean (born 16 October 1986, in Alba Iulia) is a Romanian former striker.

Early life
Zăgrean was born on 16 October 1986 in Alba Iulia, Romania.

Internațional 
Zăgrean was transferred to newly promoted team Internaţional Curtea de Argeş. He made his debut on 1 November 2009 in a 1–0 loss to FC Vaslui at Municipal Stadium. Zăgrean was used in all remaining matches in championship by coach Ştefan Stoica. He scored his first goal for Internațional on 13 December 2009 against Steaua București making 2–2 at Ghencea. He was assisted by Emmanuel Koné.

Politehnica Timișoara 
Zăgrean was loaned to FC Silvania for a 6-month spell and his good results caused Politehnica Timișoara to buy him. He signed a contract on 17 January 2011 along his new-teammates Sergei Lepmets, Sorin Ghionea and Nikola Ignjatijević and he said : "I met an extraordinary group, I arrived at a club professional who knows what they want. We expect a long war, we will fight to win to make the entire city happy". Zăgrean made his debut for Politehnica Timișoara in 0–0 draw against arch-rivals Steaua București. He scored his first goal against Astra Ploieşti in 2–2 draw. He score for 2-2. In-form Zăgrean scored again two goals against Sportul Studenţesc.

International career
Zăgrean is a former Romania U-17 international who played six matches and scored two goals.

References

External links

1986 births
Sportspeople from Alba Iulia
Romanian footballers
Association football forwards
CSM Unirea Alba Iulia players
FC Politehnica Timișoara players
Liga I players
Living people